Emory Andrew Tate III (born December 1, 1986) is a British-American social media personality, businessman, and former professional kickboxer. 

Tate began practicing kickboxing in 2005 and gained his first championship in 2009. He attracted wider attention in 2016, when he appeared on the British reality show Big Brother and was removed after his comments on social media attracted controversy. He began offering paid courses and memberships through his website and rose to fame as an internet celebrity, promoting an "ultra-masculine, ultra-luxurious lifestyle". A self-described misogynist, Tate's controversial commentary has resulted in his suspension from several social media platforms.

On December 29, 2022, Tate and his brother, Tristan, were arrested in Romania along with two women; all four are suspected of human trafficking and forming an organized crime group. Romanian police allege that the group coerced victims into creating paid pornography for social media.

Early life
Emory Andrew Tate III was born on December 1, 1986, in Walter Reed Army Medical Center in Washington, D.C. He is mixed-race. His African American father Emory Tate was a chess international master and his mother worked as a catering assistant. He has a brother, Tristan. He was raised in Chicago, Illinois and Goshen, Indiana.  After his parents divorced, his mother brought both brothers to England. Tate was raised in the Christian faith. He learned to play chess at the age of five and competed in adult tournaments as a child.

Kickboxing career
Tate started practicing boxing and other martial arts in 2005, and worked in the TV advertising industry to support himself. In November 2008, he was ranked the seventh-best light heavyweight kickboxer in Britain by the International Sport Kickboxing Association (ISKA). In 2009, he gained his first championship when he won the British ISKA Full Contact Cruiserweight Championship in Derby, and was ranked number one in his division in Europe. Tate's kickboxing nickname was "King Cobra".

In 2011, Tate won his first ISKA world title in a rematch against Jean-Luc Benoit via knockout, having previously lost to Benoit by decision. In 2012, Tate lost the Enfusion championship tournament to Franci Grajš. Before his loss, he was ranked second-best light-heavyweight kickboxer in the world. In 2013, Tate won his second ISKA world title in a 12-round match against Vincent Petitjean, making him world champion in two weight divisions.

Big Brother 
Tate came to public attention in 2016 when he appeared on the British reality show Big Brother, during its seventeenth series. While appearing on the show, he came under scrutiny for having made homophobic and racist comments on Twitter. He was removed from the show after six days, with producers citing a video apparently showing him hitting a woman with a belt. Tate and the woman said that they were friends and that the actions in the video were consensual. Vice later reported that the removal was caused by an ongoing police investigation, closed in 2019 with no charges filed.

Online ventures 
Tate's website offers training courses on accumulating wealth and "male–female interactions". According to the website, he also operated a webcam studio using his girlfriends as employees. Tate and his brother Tristan started the webcam business, employing as many as 75 webcam models to sell "fake sob stories" to male callers, claiming to have made millions of dollars doing so. He later said that the business model was a "total scam".

Tate operated Hustler's University, a platform where members paid a $49.99 monthly membership fee to receive instruction on ways to make money outside traditional employment, such as cryptocurrency, copywriting, and e-commerce, which was facilitated by pre-recorded videos and a Discord server. The website employed an affiliate marketing program, where members received a commission for recruiting others to the platform. Tate became highly prominent in 2022 by encouraging members of Hustler's University to post large numbers of videos of him to social media platforms in an effort to maximize engagement. As of August 2022, its website had amassed over 100,000 subscribers. That same month, the Irish-American financial services company Stripe pulled out of processing subscriptions for the platform, and Hustler's University shut down its affiliate marketing program. Paul Harrigan, a marketing professor at the University of Western Australia, stated the affiliate program constituted a social media pyramid scheme.

After Hustler's University was shut down, Tate launched a rebranded version of the program called "The Real World" in October 2022.

Tate also operates a private network called "The War Room" which is advertised as a "global network in which exemplars of individualism work to free the modern man from socially induced incarceration."

Social media
Tate received attention for his tweets describing his view of what qualifies as sexual harassment amid the Harvey Weinstein sexual abuse cases and for tweeting several statements about his view that sexual assault victims share responsibility for their assaults. In 2017, he was criticized for tweeting that depression "isn't real".

Tate self-identifies as a libertarian. He initially became known among online far-right circles through his appearances on InfoWars and acquaintances with far-right figures such as Mike Cernovich, Jack Posobiec, and Paul Joseph Watson. He became widely known in mid-2022 and was searched on Google more times than both Donald Trump and COVID-19 that July. In an interview, he described himself:

He has stated that women "belong in the home", that they "can't drive", and that they are "given to the man and belong to the man", as well as claiming that men prefer dating 18-year-olds and 19-year-olds because they are "likely to have had sex with fewer men".

The White Ribbon Campaign, a nonprofit organization opposing male-on-female violence, has called Tate's commentary "extremely misogynistic" and its possible long-term effects on his young male audience "concerning". Hope not Hate, an anti-extremism advocacy group, has commented that Tate's social media presence might present a "dangerous slip road into the far-right" for his audience. In response to criticism, Tate stated that his content includes "many videos praising women" and mainly aims at teaching his audience to avoid "toxic and low value people as a whole". He further stated that he plays a "comedic character" and said that people believed "absolutely false narratives" about him.

In November 2022, after the acquisition of Twitter by Elon Musk, Tate's Twitter account was unbanned. In December 2022, Tate addressed the environmentalist Greta Thunberg in a tweet extolling his carbon-emitting automobiles and asked for her email address to give her more information. Thunberg replied with the fake email address "smalldickenergy@getalife.com". The exchange received substantial attention on Twitter, with Thunberg's retort quickly becoming one of the most-liked tweets ever.

According to the Guardian in February 2023, Tate is popular among British teenage boys, who mimic his phrases and philosophy, and reported that "virtually every parent in Britain" had heard of him. Parents and schoolteachers expressed concern that he was influencing boys to exhibit misogynistic and aggressive behavior. A 2023 survey conducted by Hope not Hate found that eight in ten British boys aged 16-17 had consumed Tate's content and that 45% of British men aged 16–24 had a positive view of him, compared to only 1% of British women aged 16-17 who held a positive view of Tate.

Bans
Three of Tate's Twitter accounts have been suspended at different times. In 2021, an account that he created to evade his previous ban was verified by Twitter, contrary to their policies. The account was subsequently permanently banned, and Twitter said the verification occurred in error. In August 2022, following an online campaign to deplatform him, Tate was permanently banned from Facebook and Instagram, losing 4.7 million followers from the latter. Parent company Meta claimed he had violated their policy on "dangerous organizations and individuals". TikTok, where videos featuring Tate's name as a hashtag have been viewed over 13 billion times, also removed his account after determining that it violated their policies on "content that attacks, threatens, incites violence against, or otherwise dehumanizes an individual or a group". Shortly thereafter, YouTube also suspended his channel, citing multiple violations, including hate speech and COVID-19 misinformation, and he later deleted his own Twitch channel.

Tate responded to the bans by saying that, while most of his comments were taken out of context, he took responsibility for how they were received. Media personality Jake Paul denounced Tate's sexism, but criticized the bans as censorship. Tate's content continued to circulate on Facebook, Instagram, and TikTok after the bans via fan accounts. Following the bans, Tate moved to alt-tech platforms Gettr and Rumble, making the latter briefly become the most downloaded app on the App Store.

Personal life 
In 2017, Tate moved from the United Kingdom to Romania. He said that he moved because he liked "living in countries where corruption is accessible for everybody" and believed that it would be less likely to face rape charges in Romania, stating that Romanian police would ask women reporting rapes for "evidence" or "CCTV proof", whereas in the Western world, amid the MeToo movement, Tate said that any woman "at any point in the future can destroy your life."  

Tate was raised Christian, and later became an atheist. By early 2022, he identified as a Christian again, and said that he tithed £16,000 to the Romanian Orthodox Church on a monthly basis. After a video of him praying at a mosque in Dubai went viral in October 2022, he announced on his Gettr account that he had converted to Islam. 

On March 4, 2023, while incarcerated in Romania, Tate's legal team stated "he has a dark spot on his lung, most likely a tumour" following a medical consultation in Dubai, sparking online rumors related to whether he has lung cancer. On March 5, Tate denied on Twitter that he had cancer.

Criminal investigations

2015 British investigation
In January 2023, VICE News reported that Tate had been accused by two women of rape, and by another of repeated strangulation, which Tate denied. In 2019, after a four-year investigation, the Crown Prosecution Service declined to file charges for any of the allegations, stating that the evidence "did not meet our legal test, and there was no realistic prospect of a conviction", and that "it would be wrong to say there was just one issue" with the evidence. The three women have commented that the case was mishandled, with the police apologising for delays in the investigation, while according to Tate, the police "found [exculpatory] messages from the girls' phones".

2022–present Romanian investigation 
On April 11, 2022, a man called the U.S. embassy to report that his former girlfriend, an American citizen, was being held captive in the Tate brothers' home in Pipera, Romania. The Romanian police raided the home, and a nearby webcam studio belonging to the Tates, where they discovered four women. Two of them, the American and another Romanian woman, told the police they were being held against their will, sparking an in-rem investigation into human trafficking and rape by DIICOT, the Romanian anti-organized crime agency. The two brothers were interrogated and released. At the time, they were heard as witnesses rather than suspects.

On December 29, 2022, the police arrested both Tate brothers and two women. All four are suspected of human trafficking and forming an organized crime group, and one of them (unidentified due to Romanian law) is suspected of rape. DIICOT accuses the Tates of having recruited women through the "loverboy" method — which consists of misrepresenting one's intention to commit to a romantic relationship — and having forced them to create explicit content for websites like OnlyFans, as part of an organized crime group the Tates allegedly formed in early 2021. DIICOT identified six potential victims. Social media rumors attributed Andrew Tate's arrest to pizza boxes shown in his response video to Greta Thunberg, which Romanian authorities denied. After an initial 24-hour pre-trial detention, the judge prolonged their detention by 30 days. The Tates appealed the extension, but the appeal was rejected on January 10. Under Romanian law, it can be prolonged for a maximum of 180 days. At an unspecified date in December, the Tate brothers filed a cease and desist and threatened legal action against one of the accusers. 

Romanian authorities seized 29 assets, including 15 cars and more than 10 properties, as well as watches and sums of money, that belonged to the Tate brothers or their companies, totaling to almost $4 million. If they are convicted, these assets will be forfeited to the state and used to pay civil and moral damages to any victims. As of January 5, two potential victims had joined the case as civil parties and filed statements against the suspects. On January 14, the cars at the Tates' home were transported to a storage location.

On January 7, one of the Tate's lawyers said that the defense team had still not obtained a copy of the evidence presented by the prosecution to the judge. The lawyer also said that the Tate brothers had not been given an accurate translation during their hearing for the 30-day extension. He requested the opportunity to confront the accusers in court, and said that some of the six potential victims identified by DIICOT had not filed a complaint against the suspects. Andrew Tate briefly went to the hospital for a check-up before being returned to custody. Two women who have lived with the Tate brothers have publicly defended them, and two more, who are part of the six alleged victims identified by DIICOT, have denied that they were victimized.

On January 20, a Romanian court extended the brothers' pre-trial detention until February 27; the court's reasoning was based on a desire to safeguard the investigation, and avoid the Tates leaving the country. On January 25, while being taken for questioning at Romania's organized crime unit, Andrew said the case against him was "empty" and told reporters that "they know we have done nothing wrong". On February 1, he appealed the decision to extend his detention. The appeal was rejected by the Bucharest Court of Appeal. That same day, Tina Glandian, an attorney who has previously represented Chris Brown and Mike Tyson, was added to the legal team. She released a public statement alleging that the situation constituted a "violation of international human rights".

Witnesses and accusers were targeted in an online harassment campaign. In February 2023, the legal team for the Tate brothers confirmed that a cease and desist letter was sent to one of the accusers in December 2022, threatening to sue her and her parents for $300 million over defamatory statements. Prosecutors obtained alleged wiretaps of phone calls made by Tate to two associates, instructing them to lobby two Romanian right-wing politicians, George Simion and Diana Iovanovici Șoșoacă, to support his release.  

On February 21, a Romanian court once again extended their period of detention by another 30 days. On March 14, 2023, Tate was denied bail for a third time.

Kickboxing record

|-  bgcolor="#CCFFCC"
| 2020-12-16 || Win || align=left| Cosmin Lingurar || KO Masters 8|| Bucharest, Romania || TKO (retirement) || 2 || 2:02
|-
|-  bgcolor="#CCFFCC"
| 2020-11-16 || Win || align=left| Iulian Strugariu || RXF One Night 3 Show|| Bucharest, Romania || TKO (punches) || 1 || 0:49
|-
|-  bgcolor="#CCFFCC"
| 2020-02-10 || Win || align=left| Miralem Ahmeti || KO Masters 7|| Bucharest, Romania || KO (left high kick) || 1 || 0:58
|-
|-  bgcolor="#FFBBBB"
| 2016-12-03 || Loss || align=left| Ibrahim El Boustati|| Enfusion Live 44|| The Hague, Netherlands || TKO || 1 || N/A
|-
|-  bgcolor="#CCFFCC"
! style=background:white colspan=8 |
|-
|-  bgcolor="#CCFFCC"
| 2015-03-14 || Win || align=left| Jean-Luc Benoît || Boxe in Défi 16|| Muret, France || Decision || 7 || 2:00
|-  bgcolor="#CCFFCC"
| 2015-01-01 || Win || align=left| Liang Ling || K1 – China vs USA|| Changsha, China || Decision || 3 || 3:00
|-
|-  bgcolor="#CCFFCC"
| 2014-06-29 || Win ||align=left| Wendell Roche || Enfusion Live 19|| London, England || TKO || 2 || N/A
|-
|-  bgcolor="#CCFFCC"
! style=background:white colspan=8 |
|-
|-  bgcolor="#FFBBBB"
| 2014-04-26 || Loss ||align=left| Miroslav Cingel || Enfusion Live 17, Semi-finals|| Žilina, Slovakia || Decision || 3 || 3:00
|-
|-  bgcolor="#CCFFCC"
| 2014-03-15 || Win ||align=left| Cyril Vetter || Power Trophy 2014|| Châteaurenard, France || KO || 1 (12) || N/A
|-
! style=background:white colspan=8 |
|-
|-  bgcolor="#CCFFCC"
| 2013-12-01 || Win ||align=left| Laszlo Szabo || Enfusion Live 11|| London, England || Decision (unanimous) || 3 || 3:00
|-
|-  bgcolor="#CCFFCC"
| 2013-06-29 || Win ||align=left| Marlon Hunt || Enfusion Live 6|| London, England || Decision (unanimous) || 3 || 3:00
|-
|-  bgcolor="#CCFFCC"
| 2013-03-30 || Win ||align=left| Marino Schouten || Enfusion Live 3|| London, England || Decision (unanimous) || 3 || 3:00
|-
|-  bgcolor="#CCFFCC"
| 2013-03-09 || Win ||align=left| Vincent Petitjean || Power Trophy 2013|| Châteaurenard, France || Decision (split) || 12 || 2:00
|-
! style=background:white colspan=8 |
|-
|-  bgcolor="#CCFFCC"
| 2013-02-02 || Win ||align=left| David Radeff || Enfusion Live 1|| Zwevegem, Belgium || Decision (unanimous) || 3 || 3:00
|-
|-  bgcolor="FFBBBB"
| 2012-12-02 || Loss ||align=left| Franci Grajš || Enfusion 3: Trial of the Gladiators|| Ljubljana, Slovenia || KO (knee) || 1 || N/A
|-
! style=background:white colspan=8 |
|-
|-  bgcolor="CCFFCC"
| 2012-12-02 || Win ||align=left| Ritchie Hocking || Enfusion 3: Trial of the Gladiators, Semi-finals|| Ljubljana, Slovenia || KO || 1 || N/A
|-
|-  bgcolor="#FFBBBB"
| 2012-05-12 || Loss ||align=left| Sahak Parparyan || It's Showtime 56|| Kortrijk, Belgium || Decision (unanimous) || 5 || 3:00
|-
! style=background:white colspan=8 |
|-
|-  bgcolor="#CCFFCC"
| 2012-03-31 || Win ||align=left| Joe McGovan || The Main Event|| Manchester, England || KO (three knockdowns)|| 1 || 1:23
|-
|-  bgcolor="#FFBBBB"
| 2011-11-12 || Loss ||align=left| Vincent Petitjean || La 18ème Nuit des Champions|| Marseille, France || Decision (unanimous) || 8 || 2:00
|-
! style=background:white colspan=8 |
|-
|-  bgcolor="CCFFCC"
| 2011-08-17 || Win ||align=left| Adnan Omeragić || Enfusion 3: Trial of the Gladiators, Quarter Final|| Ohrid, North Macedonia ||TKO (eye injury) || N/A || N/A
|-
|-  bgcolor="CCFFCC"
| 2011-08-12 || Win ||align=left| Sammy Masa || Enfusion 3: Trial of the Gladiators, First round|| Ohrid, North Macedonia ||KO  || 2 || N/A
|-
|-  bgcolor="#CCFFCC"
| 2011-06-05 || Win ||align=left| Jean-Luc Benoît || Pure Force 9|| Luton, England || KO || 8 (12) || 2:00
|-
! style=background:white colspan=8 |
|-
|-  bgcolor="#FFBBBB"
| 2011-03-19 || Loss ||align=left| Jean-Luc Benoît || Boxe in Défi 12|| Muret, France || Decision || 12 || 2:00
|-
! style=background:white colspan=8 |
|-
|-  bgcolor="#CCFFCC"
| 2010-10-16 || Win ||align=left| Jamie Bates|| History in the Making 4|| Nottingham, England || KO || 8 || N/A
|-
|-  bgcolor="#CCFFCC"
| 2009-09-26 || Win ||align=left| Daniel Hughes ||  IKF Kickboxing|| Bristol, England || KO || 1 (10) || N/A
|-
! style=background:white colspan=8 |
|-
|-  bgcolor="#CCFFCC"
| 2009-04-25 || Win ||align=left| Paul Randle ||  Championship Kickboxing|| Derby, England || KO || 5 || 2:00
|-
! style=background:white colspan=8 |
|-
|-  bgcolor="#CCFFCC"
| 2008-09-14 || Win ||align=left| Mo Kargbo || Absolute Adrenaline|| Bournemouth, England || TKO || 5 || N/A
|-
|-  bgcolor="#CCFFCC"
| 2008-07-12 || Win ||align=left| Ollie Green || International Kickboxing at the Circus Tavern|| Essex, England || TKO || 4 || 1:00
|-
|-  bgcolor="#CCFFCC"
| 2008-05-11 || Win ||align=left| Lee Whitfield || IKF Pro & Amateur Kickboxing|| Kent, England || Decision || 6 (6) || 2:00
|-
|-  bgcolor="#FFBBBB"
| 2008-02-24 || Loss ||align=left| Luke Sines || IKF Pro & Amateur Kickboxing|| Kent, England || Decision (unanimous) || 5 (5) || 2:00
|-
|-  bgcolor="#FFBBBB"
| 2007-04-07 || Loss ||align=left| Scott Gibson || Golden Belt|| Hove, England || KO (overhand right) || 4 (7) || 0:37
|-
! style=background:white colspan=8 |
|-
| style=background:white colspan=8 |Legend:

Mixed martial arts record

Professional record

|-
|Win
|align=center|2–1
|Shane Kavanagh
|KO (punches)
|Ultimate Warrior Challenge 13
|
|align=center|1
|align=center|3:00
|Essex, England
|
|-
|Loss
|align=center|1–1
|Reza Meldavian
|Decision (unanimous)
|Ultimate Warrior Challenge 4
| 
|align=center|3
|align=center|5:00
|Essex, England
|
|-
|Win
|align=center|1–0
|Matthew Wilkins
|Decision (unanimous)
|Ultimate Warrior Challenge 3
|
|align=center|2
|align=center|5:00
|Essex, England
|

Amateur record
 

|-
|Win
|align=center|2–1
|Luke Barnatt
|Decision (unanimous)
|Ultimate Warrior Challenge 12
|
|align=center|3
|align=center|5:00
|Essex, England
|
|-
|Loss
|align=center|1–1
|William Morley
|Decision (unanimous)
|Ultimate Warrior Challenge 2
|
|align=center|2
|align=center|5:00
|Southend-on-Sea, England
|
|-
|Win
|align=center|1–0
|Lee Mayo
|Submission (guillotine choke)
|Ultimate Warrior Challenge 1
|
|align=center|2
|align=center|1:05
|Southend-on-Sea, England
|

Notes

References

External links

 Official website
 
 

1986 births
Living people
21st-century American businesspeople
21st-century British businesspeople
African-American mixed martial artists
African-American Muslims
American expatriate sportspeople in Romania
American Internet celebrities
American male karateka
American male kickboxers
American male mixed martial artists
American people imprisoned abroad
American prisoners and detainees
Black British sportsmen
British expatriate sportspeople in Romania
British Internet celebrities
British male karateka
British male kickboxers
British male mixed martial artists
British Muslims
British people imprisoned abroad
British people of African-American descent
British prisoners and detainees
Businesspeople from Chicago
Businesspeople from Washington, D.C.
Converts to Eastern Orthodoxy from atheism or agnosticism
Converts to Islam from Eastern Orthodoxy
Cruiserweight kickboxers
Former Romanian Orthodox Christians
Internet-related controversies
Light heavyweight kickboxers
Mixed martial artists utilizing karate
People from Goshen, Indiana
Prisoners and detainees of Romania
Sports world champions
Sportspeople from Chicago
Sportspeople from Luton
Sportspeople from Washington, D.C.